Keith Brown (born 24 December 1979) is a Scottish former professional footballer. During his career he made league appearances for Barnsley, Oxford United, Falkirk (where he scored once against Airdrieonians) and Berwick Rangers (where he scored once against Forfar Athletic).

Career 
Brown played in the 2000 Football League First Division play-off Final for Barnsley where he finished on the losing side. After retiring from the playing side of the game he became a coach and served at Accrington Stanley and Oldham Athletic where he worked until 12 January 2016.

References

External links
 
 

1979 births
Living people
Barnsley F.C. players
Falkirk F.C. players
Oxford United F.C. players
Blackburn Rovers F.C. players
Berwick Rangers F.C. players
English Football League players
Scottish Football League players
Association football central defenders
Footballers from Edinburgh
Scottish footballers
Oldham Athletic A.F.C. non-playing staff